Zohrab may refer to:

First name 

Zohrab Mnatsakanyan, Armenian diplomat and Deputy Minister of Foreign Affairs

Last name 

Doug Zohrab, (1917–2008), New Zealand diplomat and public servant
Krikor Zohrab (or Grigor Zohrap) (1861–1915), influential Armenian writer, politician, lawyer and member of parliament in the Ottoman Council. Assassinated during the Armenian genocide in 1915

Geography

Fiction 

 Zohrab the Hostage, an 1832 novel by James Justinian Morier

See also
Rustam and Zohrab, the third mugham opera by Uzeyir Hajibeyov
Zöhrabkənd, village in the Davachi Rayon of Azerbaijan
Zohrabai, also Zohrabai Agrewali (1868–1913), one of the most noted and influential singers of Hindustani Classical Music from the early 1900s